Looking Glass Rock is a pluton monolith in the Appalachian Mountains of western North Carolina, United States.

Description

Named for the way its granite face reflects the sunshine, it rises from the valley floor to an elevation of almost .

Trails from Forest Service Road 475 and 475B lead to the top of the mountain. It is a moderate/strenuous trail climbing 1700 ft over 3.1 miles to its peak where panoramic views can be seen. There is a flat slab on the top, that can be used as a helipad.

Looking Glass Rock is a popular rock climbing destination. Whether it is free climbing, multi-pitch or aid climbing, dozens of routes traverse the South Face, North Face, Nose Area, Sun Wall, Invisible Wall and Hidden Wall to the top of the mountain.

From the top of Looking Glass Rock, panoramic views can be seen of the Blue Ridge Parkway and surrounding mountains of Transylvania County.

See also

 List of mountains in North Carolina

References

External links

Mountains of North Carolina
Protected areas of Transylvania County, North Carolina
Pisgah National Forest
Mountains of Transylvania County, North Carolina